The regent whistler (Pachycephala schlegelii) is a species of bird in the family Pachycephalidae. It is endemic to the highlands of New Guinea. Its natural habitat is subtropical or tropical moist montane forests.

Subspecies
Three subspecies are recognized:
 P. s. schlegelii – Schlegel, 1871: Found in northwest New Guinea
 P. s. cyclopum – Hartert, 1930: Found in north-central New Guinea
 P. s. obscurior – Hartert, 1896: Found in west-central to eastern New Guinea

References

regent whistler
Birds of New Guinea
Endemic fauna of New Guinea
regent whistler
Taxonomy articles created by Polbot